A false alarm, also called a nuisance alarm, is the deceptive or erroneous report of an emergency, causing unnecessary panic and/or bringing resources (such as emergency services) to a place where they are not needed. False alarms may occur with residential burglary alarms, smoke detectors, industrial alarms, and in signal detection theory.  False alarms have the potential to divert emergency responders away from legitimate emergencies, which could ultimately lead to loss of life. In some cases, repeated false alarms in a certain area may cause occupants to develop alarm fatigue and to start ignoring most alarms, knowing that each time it will probably be false. Intentionally falsely activating alarms in businesses and schools can lead to serious disciplinary actions, and criminal penalties such as fines and jail time.

Overview 
The term “false alarm” refers to alarm systems in many different applications being triggered by something other than the expected trigger-event. Examples of this those applications include residential burglar alarms, smoke detectors, industrial alarms, and signal detection theory. The term “false alarm” may actually be semantically incorrect in some uses. For example, a residential burglar alarm could easily be triggered by the residents of a home accidentally. The alarm is not necessarily false – it was triggered by the expected event – but it is “false” in the sense that the police should not be alerted. Due to this problem, false alarms can also be referred to as “nuisance alarms.”

Sociologist Robert Bartholomew explains that there are many negative effects of false alarms, such as "fear, havoc, disruptions to emergency services, and wasted resources." Health and safety can also be effected, as they can cause anxiety and encourage people to race toward an alarm or away from it, which can result in accidents in the panic. One more problem is the "Cry Wolf Effect", which can cause people to ignore legitimate alarms; "in the event of a real attack, subsequent warnings may be taken lightly or ignored altogether."

Types

Residential burglar alarms 

In the United States, between 94% and 98% of all burglar alarm activations are falsely triggered.

Causes and prevention 
Residential burglar alarms can be caused by improper arming and disarming of the system, power outages and weak batteries, wandering pets, and unsecured doors and windows.  In the U.S. false alarms cost police agencies up 6.5 million personnel hours, according to the International Association of Chiefs of Police. A 2002 study by the U.S. Justice Department estimated the cost of false alarms to be as high as $1.5 billion. Due to this cost, many cities now require permits for burglar alarms, have enacted verified response protocols, or have introduced fines for excessive false alarms.

Improper arming and disarming of the system 
This is typically caused by simple mistakes like entering the wrong passcode or letting too much time pass before entering the code. These types of false alarms can be prevented by taking more time to disarm systems, and entering a home with at least one hand free to properly disarm one's system.

Untrained users 
Untrained users can be anyone who may need to temporarily access one's home but is unfamiliar with one's system. Common untrained users include cleaning crews, repairmen, dog walkers, or babysitters. Better educating temporary users about a particular system can prevent them from accidentally triggering it.

Power problems 
A home burglar alarm may accidentally activate due to power issues. These issues can be caused by weak batteries, an inconsistent power source (like voltage drops or current rises), or a power outage where a backup power method is either absent or weakened. Preventing this type of false alarm is usually achieved by changing the main and backup batteries and/or improving reliability of a power source.

Pets 
Some motion sensors will be triggered by pets moving around a home. This problem can be fixed by finding motion detectors that are not sensitive to infrared signatures belonging to anything less than eighty pounds, or by restricting the access of pets to rooms with motion detectors.

Unsecured windows and doors 
Windows and doors that are not fully closed can cause the alarm contacts to be misaligned which can result in a false alarm. In addition, if a door or window is left slightly ajar, wind may be able to blow them open which will also cause a false alarm. To prevent this from happening, door and windows should always be shut securely and locked.

Smoke detectors 
False alarms are also common with smoke detectors and building fire alarm systems. They occur when smoke detectors are triggered by smoke that is not a result of a dangerous fire. Smoking cigarettes, cooking at high temperatures, burning baked goods, blowing out large numbers of birthday candles, fireplaces and woodburners when used around a smoke detector can all be causes of these false alarms. Additionally, steam can trigger an ionization smoke detector that is too sensitive, another potential cause of false alarms.

Industrial alarms 
In industrial alarm management, a false alarm (nuisance alarm) could refer either to an alarm with little information content that can usually safely be eliminated, or one that could be valid but is triggered by a faulty instrument.  Both types are problematic because of the "cry wolf" effect described above.

Signal detection theory 
In (signal) detection theory, a false alarm occurs where a non-target event exceeds the detection criterion and is identified as a target (see Constant false alarm rate).

Examples 

 The 1983 Soviet nuclear false alarm incident was caused when the Soviet Air Defense Forces' early warning system erroneously detected inbound missiles from the United States, when in reality it was a misreading caused by a specific alignment of sunlight on high-altitude clouds. The lieutenant colonel, Stanislav Petrov, recognized the false alarm, which avoided a full scale nuclear war between the two countries.
 Prior to the Boland Hall fire on January 19, 2000, many students ignored or got used to false fire alarms, which were a frequent occurrence. The fire and evacuation resulted in the deaths of 3 students and more than 50 injuries.
 On February 1, 2005, an alert sent to portions of Connecticut in error called for the evacuation of the entire state. 
 The Hawaii missile alert on January 13, 2018 was triggered by an accidental emergency message being sent out to those in the state warning of an incoming ballistic missile.

Likewise, after too many audible car alarms are found false, most people no longer pay attention to see whether someone is stealing a vehicle, so even certain experienced thieves may confess that these alarms would not deter them from stealing vehicles.

Semantics 
The term "false alarm" is actually a misnomer, and is regularly replaced by the term "nuisance alarm".  When a sensor operates, it is hardly false, and it is usually a true indication of the present state of the sensor.  A more appropriate term is nuisance, indicating that the alarm activation is inconvenient, annoying, or vexatious.  A prime example of this difference is burglar alarms being set off by spiders. (A spider crawling on a web in front of the motion detector appears very large to the motion detector.)

False alarms could also refer to situations where one becomes startled about something that is later determined to be untrue.

References

Change detection
Alarms